Lucius de Mello is a Brazilian writer and journalist. PhD student in letters at the University of São Paulo and Sorbonne University in Paris - through the CAPES / PRINT program. As a reporter, he worked for 14 years for television network Rede Globo.  Lucius de Mello is also a researcher at LEER, the Laboratory of Ethnicity, Racism and Discrimination Studies at the University of São Paulo (USP), Brazil. Master's degree in Hebrew Literature and Culture also in São Paulo University.

Bibliography
Um violino para os gatos (A Violin for the Cats), short stories, 1995
Eny e o Grande Bordel Brasileiro (Eny and the Great Brazilian Bordello), biography, 2002
A Travessia da Terra Vermelha – uma saga dos refugiados judeus no Brasil (The Crossing of the Red Land - the saga of Jewish refugees in Brazil), historical novel, 2007

References

Brazilian male writers
Brazilian journalists
Living people
Year of birth missing (living people)